The Afghanistan Telecom Regulatory Authority (ATRA) is an Afghanistan government authority created in 2006 with the goal of regulating and expanding Afghanistan's telecom industry. ATRA works to establish an environment that encourages private investment in the growth of telecom and Internet services and infrastructure.

The current head of the authority is Seyyed Moulvi Barat Shah Nadim Agha.

References

External links
  - Official website

2006 establishments in Afghanistan
Communications in Afghanistan
Government agencies in Afghanistan